Baron Sheffield is a title that has been created four times: once in the Peerage of England, twice in the Peerage of Ireland, and once in the Peerage of the United Kingdom.

The first creation, as Baron Sheffield of Butterwick, was in the Peerage of England in 1547 for Edmund Sheffield (1521–1549), second cousin of Henry VIII, who was murdered in Norwich during Kett's Rebellion. His grandson, the 
3rd Baron Sheffield, was created Earl of Mulgrave in 1626, and the 3rd Earl of Mulgrave was finally advanced to the dukedom of Buckingham and Normanby. In 1735, at the death of the 2nd Duke of Buckingham and Normanby, however, all of the titles became extinct since no heirs to them remained.

The next three creations were all in favour of one person, John Baker-Holroyd (1735–1821). In 1781, on the second creation of the title, he was made Baron Sheffield, of Dunnamore in the County of Meath in the Peerage of Ireland. This peerage was created with normal remainder to the heirs male of his body. Two years later, in 1783, John Baker-Holroyd obtained the third creation of the title when he was made Baron Sheffield, of Roscommon in the County of Roscommon, also in the Peerage of Ireland, with remainder, failing heirs male of his body, to the heirs male of his daughters from his first marriage. On the fourth creation of a Sheffield barony in 1802, John Baker-Holroyd was created Baron Sheffield, of Sheffield in the County of York, in the Peerage of the United Kingdom. In 1816 the same John Baker-Holroyd was further made Earl of Sheffield and Viscount Pevensey in the Peerage of Ireland. The latter titles were all created with remainder to the heirs male of his body. He was succeeded by his son from his second marriage.

On the death in 1909 of the 3rd Earl of Sheffield, his earldom, the Pevensey viscountcy and the Sheffield baronies of 1781 and 1802 became extinct. However, he was succeeded in the Sheffield barony of 1783 according to special remainder by Edward Stanley, 4th Baron Stanley of Alderley, who was also 3rd Baron Eddisbury and now became 4th Baron Sheffield as well. The 4th Baron Sheffield was the grandson of Lady Maria Josepha Holroyd, daughter of the 1st Earl of Sheffield. These titles remain extant and united, see Baron Stanley of Alderley for further succession.

Barons Sheffield, First creation (1547)
Edmund Sheffield, 1st Baron Sheffield (1521–1549)
John Sheffield, 2nd Baron Sheffield (–1568)
Edmund Sheffield, 3rd Baron Sheffield (–1646), created Earl of Mulgrave in 1626

Barons Sheffield, Second and fourth creations (1781; 1802), Earls of Sheffield (1816)
John Baker-Holroyd, 1st Earl of Sheffield, 1st Baron Sheffield (1735–1821)
George Augustus Frederick Charles Holroyd, 2nd Earl of Sheffield, 2nd Baron Sheffield (1802–1876)
Fredrick Henry Stuart Holroyd, Viscount Pevensey (1827–1829)
Henry North Holroyd, 3rd Earl of Sheffield, 3rd Baron Sheffield (1832–1909)

Barons Sheffield, Third creation (1783)
John Baker-Holroyd, 1st Earl of Sheffield, 1st Baron Sheffield (1735–1821)
George Augustus Frederick Charles Holroyd, 2nd Earl of Sheffield, 2nd Baron Sheffield (1802–1876)
Henry North Holroyd, 3rd Earl of Sheffield, 3rd Baron Sheffield (1832–1909)
Edward Lyulph Stanley, 4th Baron Stanley of Alderley, 3rd Baron Eddisbury, 4th Baron Sheffield (1839–1925) (known as Lord Sheffield )
Arthur Lyulph Stanley, 5th Baron Stanley of Alderley, 4th Baron Eddisbury, 5th Baron Sheffield (1875–1931) (known as Lord Stanley)
Edward John Stanley, 6th Baron Stanley of Alderley, 5th Baron Eddisbury, 6th Baron Sheffield (1907–1971) (known as Lord Stanley)
Lyulph Henry Victor Owen Stanley, 7th Baron Stanley of Alderley, 6th Baron Eddisbury, 7th Baron Sheffield (1915–1971) (known as Lord Sheffield)
Thomas Henry Oliver Stanley, 8th Baron Stanley of Alderley, 7th Baron Eddisbury, 8th Baron Sheffield (1927–2013) (known as Lord Stanley)
Richard Oliver Stanley 9th Baron Stanley of Alderley, 8th Baron Eddisbury and 9th Baron Sheffield (born 1956)

The heir presumptive is the present holder's brother Hon. Charles Ernest Stanley (born 1960), who has three daughters. The next in line to the peerages is his brother Hon. Harry John Stanley (born 1963), whose heir is his only son Bertram Thomas Zulfikar Stanley (born 2007).

See also
Duke of Buckingham and Normanby
Earl of Mulgrave
Baron Stanley of Alderley

Notes

References
Kidd, Charles, Williamson, David (editors). Debrett's Peerage and Baronetage (1990 edition). New York: St Martin's Press, 1990, 

 
1547 establishments in England
1735 disestablishments in England
1781 establishments in Ireland
1783 establishments in Ireland
1802 establishments in the United Kingdom
1909 disestablishments in Ireland
Noble titles created in 1547
Extinct baronies in the Peerage of England
Baronies in the Peerage of Ireland
Noble titles created in 1781
Noble titles created in 1783
Noble titles created in 1802
Noble titles created for UK MPs
Extinct baronies in the Peerage of the United Kingdom
Peerages created with special remainders
Stanley family